Cornwall is a county in the south west of England, UK.

Cornwall may also refer to:

Land and titles 
 Duchy of Cornwall, land belonging to the Duke of Cornwall
 Duke of Cornwall, a title belonging to the eldest son of the English Sovereign
 Earl of Cornwall, a title superseded in 1337 by the Duke of Cornwall

Places

Australia
Cornwall, Queensland, a locality in the Maranoa Region
Cornwall, Tasmania, a locality in the Break O’Day Council area
Cornwall County, Tasmania, one of the cadastral divisions of Tasmania

Canada

Ontario
Cornwall (electoral district), a former federal electoral district
Cornwall, Ontario
Cornwall Island (Ontario)

Elsewhere
Cornwall, Prince Edward Island
Cornwall Island (Nunavut)

United States
Cornwall, California
Cornwall, Connecticut, a New England town
Cornwall (CDP), Connecticut, the central village in the town
Cornwall, Missouri
Cornwall, New York
Cornwall, Pennsylvania
Cornwall, Vermont
Cornwall County, Province of New York (historical)
Cornwall-on-Hudson, New York, a village within the town
North Cornwall Township, Pennsylvania
West Cornwall Township, Pennsylvania

Elsewhere
 Cornouaille, a region of Brittany, France
Cornwall County, Jamaica, one of the three divisions of the island

People with the surname

Alan Cornwall (disambiguation)
Alan Whitmore Cornwall, Archdeacon of Cheltenham
Barry Cornwall, pen name of Bryan Procter, English poet
Charles Wolfran Cornwall, MP
Claudia Maria Cornwall (born 1948), Canadian writer and journalist
Jeff Cornwall, Canadian lacrosse player
 John Cornwall (disambiguation)
John of Cornwall (disambiguation)
Luke Cornwall, English footballer
Nigel Cornwall, English bishop, son of Alan Whitmore Cornwall
Rahkeem Cornwall, Antiguan cricketer
Richard Cornwall (disambiguation)
Sonia Cornwall (1919–2006), Canadian painter and rancher
Thomas Cornwall, MP
Travis Cornwall, Canadian lacrosse player

Other uses
 Cornwall, a dragon named Cornwall from the film Quest for Camelot
 Cornwall, a series of floorstanding loudspeakers from manufacturer Klipsch
 HMS Cornwall, the name of multiple Royal Navy ships
 LNWR 2-2-2 3020 Cornwall, an early LNWR steam locomotive 
The Cornwall, a Manhattan apartment building
The Cornwall (Denver, Colorado), a Denver Landmark

See also

 
 Cornouaille (disambiguation)
 Cornwall County (disambiguation)
 Cornwall Township (disambiguation)
 Cornwallis (disambiguation)
 Kerne (disambiguation)
 Kernow (disambiguation)
 West Cornwall (disambiguation)